Aage Bendixen (16 June 1887 – 30 December 1973) was a Danish actor. He is best known for his work in short comedy films of the 1920s and 1930s in the Cinema of Denmark.

Career
He began acting in film in 1919 at the age of 32 in Væddeløberen.

Filmography
Prisoner Number One (1935) - Regissør
 Københavnere (1933)
Han, hun og Hamlet (1932) - Short sailor
Pas paa pigerne (1930)
 The Joker (1928)
Don Quixote (1926)
Fra Piazza del Popolo (1925)
Landsvägsriddare (1921) - Släpvagnen
Kärlek och björnjakt (1920) - Mr. Pålsson
Flickorna i Åre (1920) - Porter
Gudernes yndling (1920) - Jack Pudding
Et Sommereventyr eller De keder sig på Landet (1919)
Væddeløberen (1919)

External links

Danish male stage actors
Danish male film actors
Danish male silent film actors
20th-century Danish male actors
1887 births
1973 deaths